HMS Formidable was an 84-gun second rate of the Royal Navy, launched on 19 May 1825 at Chatham Dockyard. With a crew of 700 she was one of the Navy's largest ships at that time.

Service

She was designed ny Sir Robert Seppings. She was launched in May 1825 at a truly massive cost of £64,000. However, her fitting out (with guns etc) was not completed until November 1841. Her first "true commander" (i.e. other than being moved from dock to dock) was Captain Charles Sullivan who sailed her to the Mediterranean.

On 29 November 1842, Formidable ran aground off the mouth of the Llobregat on the coast of Spain. She was refloated on 2 December 1842 with the aid of two French steamships.

In 1869 Formidable became a training ship, at the National Nautical School in Portishead, and she was sold out of the navy in 1906.

In April 1844 command transferred to Captain George Frederick Rich.

Archives
Records of the National Nautical School are held at Bristol Archives (Ref. 38087) (online catalogue).

Notes

References
Lavery, Brian (2003) The Ship of the Line - Volume 1: The development of the battlefleet 1650-1850. Conway Maritime Press. .

External links 
 Film panorama of the River Avon in 1902 including footage of HMS Formidable

Ships of the line of the Royal Navy
Canopus-class ships of the line
Ships built in Chatham
1825 ships
Maritime incidents in November 1842